Dahmer – Monster: The Jeffrey Dahmer Story is the first season of the American true crime anthology series, Monster, created by Ryan Murphy and Ian Brennan for Netflix, which was released on September 21, 2022. Murphy also serves as showrunner and is an executive producer along with Brennan.

Dahmer is about the life of serial killer Jeffrey Dahmer (Evan Peters). Other main characters include Dahmer's father Lionel (Richard Jenkins), stepmother Shari (Molly Ringwald), suspicious neighbor Glenda (Niecy Nash), and grandmother Catherine (Michael Learned).

Dahmer received mixed reviews but was a commercial success, reaching the number-one spot on Netflix in the first week of its release. It became Netflix's second most-watched English-language series of all time within 28 days,  and the third Netflix series to pass 1 billion views in 60 days. The series reached number one on the Nielsen Top 10 streaming chart in the first week of its release, and placed No. 7 on Nielsen's all-time list for single-week viewership in its second week. The series received four nominations at the 80th Golden Globe Awards, including for the Best Limited or Anthology Series or Television Film, with Peters  winning for Best Actor – Miniseries or Television Film.

Synopsis
The series is about the life of Jeffrey Dahmer, and how he became one of the most notorious serial killers in America. His murders were executed in Bath Township, Ohio, West Allis, Wisconsin, and Milwaukee, Wisconsin between 1978 and 1991. The series dramatizes instances where Dahmer was nearly apprehended until his ultimate conviction and death. It also explores how police incompetence and apathy contributed to enabling his crimes.

Cast

Main

Recurring

Soundtrack
The score for the series was composed and performed by Nick Cave and Warren Ellis. The soundtrack album was released the same day as the series.

Episodes

Reception

Audience viewership
The series rose to the number-one spot on Netflix in the first week of its release. In the second week of its release, Netflix announced that Dahmer was its ninth most popular English-language TV show of all time, with 56 million households having viewed all 10 episodes. The series remained number-one for weeks and became Netflix’s second most-viewed English Netflix series of all time, and the fourth highest across any language with 701.37 million hours viewed in 21 days. The series amassed more than 865 million hours viewed in the first 28 days of its release. In 60 days it became the third Netflix series to pass 1 billion views.

Dahmer debuted at number-one on the Nielsen Top 10 streaming chart by garnering more than 3.6 billion minutes of viewing for the week of September 19–25, placing it 10th on the all-time list for single-week viewership. The following week, it jumped to No. 7 on the all-time list with 4.4 billion minutes viewed. The series topped Nielsen's streaming chart for the third consecutive week with 2.3 billion viewing minutes.

Jermey Dick of MovieWeb stated that on "October 3rd through the 9th the views of the Dahmer series made up to 205 million hours streamed" into watching the show for that time period, overall making it up to "701 million hours watched globally".

Critical response
The review aggregator website Rotten Tomatoes reported a 57% approval rating with an average rating of 6.3/10, based on 28 critic reviews. The website's critics consensus reads, "While Monster is seemingly self-aware of the peril in glorifying Jeffrey Dahmer, creator Ryan Murphy's salacious style nevertheless tilts this horror story into the realm of queasy exploitation." Metacritic, which uses a weighted average, assigned a score of 46 out of 100 based on 9 critics, indicating "mixed or average reviews".

Kayla Cobb at Decider said the show "isn't just well directed, written, and acted. It's rewriting what a crime drama can look like if we stop glorifying murderers and start focusing more on systematic failures." Caroline Framke of Variety argues that the show "simply can't rise to its own ambition of explaining both the man and the societal inequities his crimes exploited without becoming exploitative in and of itself." Malik Peay of the Los Angeles Times stated that people felt like the show was for the purposes of "entertainment industry's commercialization of tragedy". Dan Fienberg of The Hollywood Reporter praises episode 6 ("Silenced") as "easily the best episode of the series, an uncomfortably sweet and sad hour of TV that probably should have been the template for the entire show [and]...in placing a Black, deaf, gay character at the center of the narrative, the series is giving voice to somebody whose voice has too frequently been excluded from gawking serial killer portraits."

Accolades

Controversies

On September 23, 2022, Netflix removed the series' "LGBTQ" tag after backlash on social media.

The series also received backlash from the families of Dahmer's victims, accusing Netflix of profiting off their traumatic experiences and "retraumatizing [the families] all over again". Eric Perry, a relative of victim Errol Lindsey, stated that "I want people to understand this is not just a story or historical fact, these are real people’s lives. [Lindsey] was someone’s son, someone’s brother, someone’s father, someone’s friend that was ripped from [our] lives".

Production assistant Kim Alsup alleged mistreatment while on set. She stated she was one of two black crew members below the line on Dahmer, adding that "I was always being called someone else’s name, the only other Black girl who looked nothing like me, and I learned the names for 300 background extras". Alsup also alleged an "exhausting" and "unsupportive environment," stating '] there were no therapists on set. A spokesperson for Netflix countered this allegation, stating that everyone on set had access to free health and wellness sources, including access to a therapist.

Furthermore, the nature of the crimes and how they took place weren't portrayed in the right light. Shirley Hughes, the mother of Tony Hughes, whose story is told in the acclaimed sixth episode "Silenced," also spoke out against the series' depiction of events. "It didn't happen like that," Hughes told the Guardian.

Future
Having initially ordered the program in 2020 as a limited series, Netflix announced on November 7, 2022, that it had renewed Monster as an anthology series, with two further editions based on the lives of "other monstrous figures" to be announced.

Notes

References

Further reading

External links
 
 
 Official screenplay for "Silenced"

2022 American television series debuts
2022 American television series endings
2020s American crime drama television series
2020s American drama television miniseries
2020s American LGBT-related drama television series
American biographical series
American thriller television series
Crime thriller television series
Cultural depictions of Ed Gein
Works about Jeffrey Dahmer
Cultural depictions of John Wayne Gacy
English-language Netflix original programming
Gay-related television shows
Historical television series
LGBT-related controversies in television
Nonlinear narrative television series
Racism in television
Television controversies in the United States
Television series about serial killers
Television series created by Ryan Murphy (writer)
Television series set in 1966
Television series set in 1977
Television series set in 1978
Television series set in 1979
Television series set in 1981
Television series set in 1987
Television series set in 1991
Television series set in 1992
Television series set in 1994
Television shows set in Milwaukee
Television shows set in Ohio